Javier Artero López (born 16 April 1975) is a Spanish former professional footballer who played as a midfielder.

After playing for five teams in the lower leagues of his country he joined Dundee in Scotland, spending two years with the club before being forced to retire at only 27, due to illness.

Club career

Early years
Born in Madrid, Artero started playing football with local amateurs CD Colonia Moscardó. In 1995 he signed with Real Madrid, but never made it past the C team, also being loaned to another club in the community, CD Leganés of Segunda División, and appearing very rarely over the course of his only season.

Subsequently, Artero dropped down to Segunda División B and joined Málaga CF, helping the Andalusians to return to the second tier after which he signed for another side in that league, CD Badajoz. He scored his only goal as a professional in his country on 29 November 1998, the only in an away win against Albacete Balompié.

Dundee
In 1999, Artero moved abroad to San Lorenzo de Almagro from Argentina. From March–May of the following year he was loaned to Dundee F.C. of the Scottish Premier League, with the deal being made permanent on 1 July for £300,000, a club record. On the 30th, he scored in a 2–0 away victory over Motherwell.

Artero contributed one goal to a 5–0 home defeat of St Mirren on 18 November 2000. He enjoyed his best years as a professional with the Dark Blues, appearing in 75 competitive games with the side and helping them to the sixth place in his first year, with the subsequent qualification for the UEFA Intertoto Cup.

On 1 August 2001, the 26-year-old Artero was admitted to hospital with an unknown disease, which was revealed to be multiple sclerosis early into the following month. Even though he was still able to take part in some matches in the 2001–02 season, he was forced to retire from football in August 2002, being immediately named Dundee's international scout.

Artero worked as a football analyst after retiring, being a co-commentator on Real Madrid TV.

References

External links

1975 births
Living people
Spanish footballers
Footballers from Madrid
Association football midfielders
Segunda División players
Segunda División B players
Tercera División players
Real Madrid C footballers
CD Leganés players
Málaga CF players
CD Badajoz players
Argentine Primera División players
San Lorenzo de Almagro footballers
Scottish Premier League players
Dundee F.C. players
Spanish expatriate footballers
Expatriate footballers in Argentina
Expatriate footballers in Scotland
Spanish expatriate sportspeople in Argentina
Spanish expatriate sportspeople in Scotland
People with multiple sclerosis